The blue ling (Molva dypterygia) is a member of the cod family from the North Atlantic. It is usually 70 to 110 cm long, but the maximum length is 155 cm. Blue ling feed on fish (flatfishes, gobies, rocklings) and crustaceans and benthic invertebrates. The fish reaches sexual maturity at the age of six to 12 years.

References 
 Blue ling (Icelandic Fisheries)
 Blålange (Institute of Marine Research, Norway)
 Blue ling at Fishbase.org

blue ling
Fauna of Atlantic Canada
Fish of the North Atlantic
Fish of Europe
blue ling
Taxa named by Thomas Pennant